The Enciclopedia Italiana di Scienze, Lettere e Arti (Italian for "Italian Encyclopedia of Science, Letters, and Arts"), best known as Treccani for its developer Giovanni Treccani or Enciclopedia Italiana, is an Italian-language encyclopaedia. The publication Encyclopaedias: Their History Throughout The Ages regards it as one of the greatest encyclopaedias along with the Encyclopædia Britannica and others.

History
The first edition was published serially between 1929 and 1936. In all, 35 volumes were published, plus one index volume. The set contained 60,000 articles and 50 million words. Each volume is approximately 1,015 pages, and 37 supplementary volumes were published between 1938 and 2015. The director was Giovanni Gentile and redactor-in-chief .

Most of the articles are signed with the initials of the author. An essay credited to Benito Mussolini entitled "The Doctrine of Fascism" was included in the 1932 edition of the encyclopedia, although it was ghost-written by Gentile.

The articles are now available on line for free.

See also
 Lists of encyclopedias

References

External links

1929 non-fiction books
Italian-language encyclopedias
Italian encyclopedias
20th-century encyclopedias
Italian Fascism
National encyclopedias